The Flat Tops Trail Scenic Byway is a National Forest Scenic Byway and Colorado Scenic and Historic Byway located in Routt, Garfield, and Rio Blanco counties, Colorado, US.

Route

Gallery

See also

History Colorado
List of scenic byways in Colorado
Scenic byways in the United States

Notes

References

External links

America's Scenic Byways: Colorado
Colorado Department of Transportation
Colorado Scenic & Historic Byways Commission
Colorado Scenic & Historic Byways
Colorado Travel Map
Colorado Tourism Office
History Colorado
National Forest Scenic Byways

Colorado Scenic and Historic Byways
National Forest Scenic Byways
National Forest Scenic Byways in Colorado
Routt National Forest
White River National Forest
Transportation in Colorado
Transportation in Rio Blanco County, Colorado
Transportation in Routt County, Colorado
Tourist attractions in Colorado
Tourist attractions in Rio Blanco County, Colorado
Tourist attractions in Routt  County, Colorado